Pryshyb is an urban-type settlement in Vasylivka Raion of Zaporizhzhia Oblast in Ukraine. It is located in the steppe south of the city of Zaporizhzhia. Pryshyb belongs to Mykhailivka settlement hromada, one of the hromadas of Ukraine. Population: 

Until 18 July 2020, Pryshyb belonged to Mykhailivka Raion. The raion was abolished in July 2020 as part of the administrative reform of Ukraine, which reduced the number of raions of Zaporizhzhia Oblast to five. The area of Mykhailivka Raion was merged into Vasylivka Raion.

Economy

Transportation
Pryshyb railway station, located in the settlement, on the railway connecting Zaporizhzhia and Melitopol. There is some passenger traffic.

The settlement is close to  highway M18 which connects Zaporizhzhia and Melitopol.

References

Urban-type settlements in Vasylivka Raion